The London Victory Celebrations of 1946 were British Commonwealth, Empire and Allied victory celebrations held after the defeat of Nazi Germany and Japan in World War II. On 1 November 1945 the Prime Minister appointed a committee under the chairmanship of the Home Secretary, James Chuter Ede to formulate plans for official Victory Celebrations. The celebrations took place in London on 8 June 1946, and consisted mainly of a military parade through the city and a night time fireworks display. Most British allies took part in the parade, including Belgium, Brazil, China, Czechoslovakia, France, Greece, Luxembourg the Netherlands and the United States.

Victory parade

The first part of the parade was the Chiefs of Staff's procession, featuring the British Chiefs of Staff together with the Supreme Allied Commanders. This was followed by a mechanised column which went from Regent's Park to Tower Hill to The Mall (where the saluting base was) and then back to Regent's Park. It was more than four miles long and contained more than 500 vehicles from the Royal Navy, the Royal Air Force, British civilian services and the British Army (in that order).

Next came a marching column, which went from Marble Arch to The Mall to Hyde Park Corner. This was headed by the flags of the Allied nations which took part in the parade, each with an honour guard. Next came units of the navies, air forces, civilian services and units of the British Empire, and the armed forces of the Commonwealth Dominions. They were followed by units from the Royal Navy, followed by British civilian services, the British Army, representatives of certain Allied air forces and the Royal Air Force. This was followed by a fly-past of 300 aircraft, led by Douglas Bader.
In the aftermath, 4,127 persons needed medical attention and 65 were taken to hospital.

Most of the allies were represented at the parade, including representatives from the US, France, Belgium, Brazil, Czechoslovakia, Denmark, Egypt, Ethiopia, Greece, Iran, Iraq, Luxembourg, Mexico, Nepal, Netherlands, Norway and Transjordan.

The only allied countries not represented at the parade were USSR, Yugoslavia, and Poland.

Australian contingent
The Australian contingent was headed by Major General Ken Eather, an officer with a distinguished record in the war. The contingent consisted of 250 servicemen and women, drawn from the three services, including Private Richard Kelliher, who had won the Victoria Cross in the Battle of Lae in 1943.

New Zealand contingent 
New Zealand was represented on the victory march by a contingent of 300 former and serving members of the armed forces. The contingent consisted of 150 representatives of the army, 100 of the Royal New Zealand Air Force, and 50 of the Royal New Zealand Navy. Women were also included in all three sections, and there was representation of the Maori Battalion. The contingent was commanded by Lieutenant-General Sir Edward Puttick, the General Officer Commanding of the New Zealand Forces During the war. The Contingent included the Victoria Cross holders, Colone Leslie Andrew VC, DSO Sergeant Alfred Clive Hulme VC and Charles Upham, VC & Bar. The contingent sailed from New Zealand on 20 April on the New Zealand hospital ship Maunganui.

Controversy about Poland 
The British government initially invited the government in Poland to send a flag party to represent Poland among the allied forces in the parade, but did not specifically invite representatives of the Polish forces in exile that had fought under British High Command. Britons including Winston Churchill, figures in the RAF and a number of MPs protested against the decision, which was described as an affront to the Polish war effort as well as an immoral concession to communist power. After these complaints, 25 pilots of the Polish fighter squadrons in the Royal Air Force, who had taken part in the Battle of Britain, were invited to march together with other foreign detachments as part of the parade of the Royal Air Force. Last-minute invitations were sent by Foreign Minister Bevin directly to the Chief of Staff of the Polish Army, General Kopanski, who was still in post in London, and to the chiefs of the Polish Air Force and the Polish Navy and to individual generals. These invitations were declined, and the airmen refused to participate in protest against the omission of the other branches of the Western backed Polish forces in exile.

The Polish government, in turn, chose not to send a delegation, and later cited the invitation to the exiled pilots as its reason to stay away. In the end, the parade took place without any Polish forces. The Soviet Union and Yugoslavia also stayed away.

Nighttime festivities
After sunset, the principal buildings of London were lit by floodlights, and crowds thronged the banks of the Thames and Westminster Bridge to watch King George VI and his family proceed down the river in the Royal barge.  The planned festivities ended with a fireworks display over Central London. However, crowds continued to gather in London and surrounded Buckingham Palace even after the Royal family had retired from the festivities. Many festival goers could not return home that night and spent the rest of the night in public parks and other public areas around London.

Events for Children

Entertainments were arranged for children in London's parks and a personal message from King George was printed on card and distributed to school children across the United Kingdom.   The message began with the phrase 'Today, as we celebrate victory'

See also 
 Berlin Victory Parade of 1945

References

External links

 Victory Parade, London 1946 by Ron Goldstein (BBC WW2 People's War Archive) An eye witness account.

Aftermath of World War II in the United Kingdom
1946 in London
Victory parades
Parades in London
Military parades in the United Kingdom
June 1946 events in the United Kingdom